Basili is an Italian surname. Notable people with the name include:

Surname
 Andrea Basili (1705–1777), Italian composer and music theorist
 Basilio Basili (1804–1895), Italian tenor and composer
 Francesco Basili (1767–1850), Italian composer and conductor
 Pier Angelo Basili (1550–1604), Italian painter
 Victor Basili (born 1940), American computer scientist

Given name
 Basili Sabatsmindeli (8th century), Georgian calligrapher, monk and writer